Sandu Negrean (born 25 November 1974) is a Romanian former football forward. In his career Negrean played for teams such as: Baia Mare, Gloria Bistriţa or Universitatea Cluj. His best period was at Gloria Bistriţa for which he scored 34 goals in 117 matches and where he made a remarkable offensive duo with Cristian Coroian. After retirement he started the manager career and worked again for Gloria Bistriţa, as an assistant coach or manager.

External links
 
 
 

1974 births
Living people
People from Năsăud
Romanian footballers
Association football forwards
Liga I players
Liga II players
ACS Sticla Arieșul Turda players
CS Minaur Baia Mare (football) players
ACF Gloria Bistrița players
FC Universitatea Cluj players
Romanian football managers
ACF Gloria Bistrița managers